The Parliamentary Secretary to the Ministry of Food Control, later the Parliamentary Secretary to the Ministry of Food was a junior Ministerial post in the Government of the United Kingdom from 1916 to 1921 and then from 1939 to 1954. The post supported the Minister of Food Control, later the Minister of Food.

List of Parliamentary Secretaries

Parliamentary Secretaries to the Ministry of Food Control, 1916-1921

Parliamentary Secretaries to the Ministry of Food, 1939-1954

Lists of government ministers of the United Kingdom
Defunct ministerial offices in the United Kingdom